Siby Mathew Peedikayil (born December 6, 1970 in Meloram) is an Indian clergyman and bishop for the Roman Catholic Diocese of Aitape. He was appointed bishop in 2021. 

The author of the bishop's coat of arms is the Slovak heraldic artist Marek Sobola.

See also
Catholic Church in India

References

Indian Roman Catholic bishops
Roman Catholic bishops of Aitape
1970 births
Living people